Brautigam or Bräutigam is a surname. Notable people with the surname include:

 Deborah Bräutigam, American political scientist
 Harry Brautigam (1948–2008), Nicaraguan economist 
 Johan Brautigam (1878–1962), Dutch trade unionist
 Otto Bräutigam (1895–1992), German diplomat
 Perry Bräutigam (born 1963), German footballer and coach
 Ronald Brautigam (born 1954), Dutch pianist
 Volker Bräutigam (born 1939), German composer and church musician

See also
 Richard Brautigan (1935–1984), novelist